Fulk I of Anjou ( 870 – 942) —  ("Fulk the Red", i.e., "Red Falcon") — held the county of Anjou first as viscount, then count, until his death.

Life
Born about 870, Fulk was the son of Ingelger of Anjou and Adelais of Amboise. He was the first Count of Anjou, ruling the county from about 908 to 942. In 899 he became Viscount of Tours and in 905 Count of Tours. In about 910 he was Count of Nantes. He increased his territory as a viscountcy of Angers and, around 929, he claimed the title Count of Anjou. During his lordship, he was frequently at war with the Normans and the Bretons. He occupied the county of Nantes in 907, but abandoned it to the Bretons in 919. Fulk I died around 942.

Family

Fulk married Roscille de Loches, daughter of Warnerius (Widone), Seigneur de Loches, de Villentrois, and de la Haye, and his wife Tecandra. He and Roscille had:

 Guy (Wido), Bishop of Soissons ( 970).
 Fulk II. Succeeded his father as Count of Anjou.

References

Further reading
 
 

870s births
942 deaths
House of Ingelger
Counts of Anjou
10th-century French people
Year of birth uncertain